Ice Age: A Mammoth Christmas is a 2011 computer animated television special and part of the Ice Age franchise, produced by Blue Sky Studios and directed by Karen Disher. It premiered on November 24, 2011 on Fox in the United States and in the United Kingdom at Christmas on Channel 4 and E4 and it was released 2 days later to DVD and Blu-ray. This Christmas special takes place between Dawn of the Dinosaurs and Continental Drift.

Despite being produced by Blue Sky Studios, the film's animation was actually done by some animators at Blue Sky and mainly by the Los Angeles/Dallas based special effects and animation company, Reel FX Creative Studios.

Plot 
Eight years after the events of the third film and before the fourth film, Christmas is coming and Scrat eyes a beaver assembling a cache of foods, among them an acorn. Scrat sneaks in and takes the acorn, along with others he finds in the area set up as decorations. He ties a large stockpile of them on a piece of bark and tries to leave with them, but they break out and roll away, leaving him with nothing.

Meanwhile, Manny brings the Christmas Rock out of storage, to Ellie's delight: the rock is intended as a surprise for Peaches, who comes sliding down a snow slope in a snowball fight with Crash and Eddie. Manny reveals that the Christmas Rock is the same one from his childhood, a family heirloom, and important as it lets Santa Claus find them to deliver presents. Diego and Sid step in to see the Christmas Rock, with Sid deriding it. Manny refuses to let Sid near the rock and Sid, to find his own means of decorations, decides to find a different decoration and chooses a tree. Crash and Eddie help him to decorate the tree with insects, small animals, and fish bones. To top the tree, Sid puts a star-shaped piece of ice on top, which is accidentally flung off like a boomerang and hits the Christmas Rock, shattering it. Furious, Manny declares that Sid is now on the "Naughty List" for ruining the Christmas rock, but dismisses the idea of Santa to Ellie, Peaches overhears this, and the young mammoth is shocked that Manny does not believe in Santa, and Sid, in tears that he destroyed the rock and is on the Naughty List, slides downhill as his tears freeze solid.

Scrat finds an acorn half frozen in a pond and steps onto the slippery surface to pull it out. After pulling it out successfully, Scrat begins to ice skate with the acorn, going through a log, where he misplaces the acorn and instead mistakenly holds onto a spider, which attacks him. Meanwhile, Sid, feet still frozen, sulks about being on the Naughty List until Peaches calls on him to snap out of it. She intends to head to the North Pole with Sid so as to convince Santa Claus to take Sid off the Naughty List, along with Crash and Eddie, who, despite their misdeeds, still want Christmas.

The four set off to the North Pole by following the Northern Lights, and move on until they reach a whiteout, which separates them for a moment until they find one another and move on, led by Sid, who mistakenly leads them off a cliff. As they fall, they are rescued by a flying reindeer, who takes them to the other side of the cliff and introduces himself as Prancer. Sid thanks the reindeer and moves on before he nearly falls down the cliff again and is caught by Peaches, who decides that the reindeer will go with them. Back at the village, however, Manny attempts to patch up the Christmas Rock with mud and sticks, to poor effect, when Ellie comes along, calling out that she cannot find Peaches, Sid, Crash, or Eddie. Diego states that the four of them headed out to the North Pole to find Santa; with that, Manny and Ellie move on to find Peaches and the others, led by Diego, who tracks them by, reluctantly, picking up Sid's scent.

Prancer and the animals arrive somewhere near the North Pole, seeing sugar plums and peppermint bark. As they continue, they are stopped by a mini sloth and the "santourage", who keep out visitors to Santa. They move towards Prancer and the animals, causing him to fly up into a block of snow, and as they try to pull him out, the ice cracks, causing an avalanche, ruining Santa's work, and toppling the rescue trio. Angered and distraught by the mess, Santa invents the Naughty List after Manny talks about it, causing the mammoth to realize Santa is real and rally everyone to make things right. All the animals fix the mess, but Santa has much more gifts than usual, so Prancer volunteers to fly the sleigh. He realizes he can't do it alone so he goes and gets his family, Dasher, Dancer, Vixen, Comet, Cupid, Donner, and Blitzen. Then, Santa leaves through the night sky, and everyone is back on the Nice List, even Sid. Then, Scrat looks at his present from Santa (which is a small nut), but blows away and gets repeatedly kicked by the reindeer while going around the Earth.

Cast 

 Ray Romano as Manny
 John Leguizamo as Sid
 Denis Leary as Diego
 Seann William Scott as Crash
 Josh Peck as Eddie
 Queen Latifah as Ellie
 Ciara Bravo as Peaches
 Karen Disher as Molehog
 Chris Wedge as Scrat
 Billy Gardell as Santa Claus
 T. J. Miller as Prancer
 Judah Friedlander as Head Mini-Sloth

Release 
A Mammoth Christmas premiered on November 24, 2011, on Fox. The special was watched by 7,100,000 viewers, making it the second most watched show in its time slot. It was nominated for Annie Award for Best Animated Special Production.

Home media 
A Mammoth Christmas was released on DVD and Blu-ray on November 26, 2011. A Mammoth Christmas was released on Disney+ on November 26, 2021 after the  Disney-Fox Merger.

References

External links 
 

2011 television specials
2010s American animated films
American television specials
American Christmas films
2011 computer-animated films
Ice Age (franchise) films
Animated Christmas television specials
Christmas television specials
Fox television specials
Santa Claus in television
Blue Sky Studios short films
Fox Television Animation films
2010s Christmas films
American Christmas television specials
Reel FX Creative Studios films
Films scored by John Paesano
20th Century Fox Television films
2011 films
2010s English-language films
Films directed by Karen Disher